Patrick Wleh (born 17 July 1991) is a Liberian international footballer who currently plays as a striker. He spent most of his club career in Malaysia and is known as the "Liberian Ronaldinho".

International career

International goals
Scores and results list Liberia's goal tally first.

References

External links

thenewdawnliberia.com
fußballtransfers.com

1991 births
Living people
Sportspeople from Monrovia
Liberian footballers
Liberia international footballers
Liberian expatriate footballers
PKNS F.C. players
Expatriate footballers in Israel
Association football forwards
LISCR FC players
Expatriate footballers in Malaysia
Liberian expatriate sportspeople in Malaysia
Selangor FA players
Sarawak United FC players